Dearden's was a chain of furniture stores based in Los Angeles, that operated for 108 years. It was founded in 1909 by Edgar Dearden, an immigrant from England. Dearden's sold furniture, appliances, cookware, other home goods, watches, and perfume. It also provided services such as check cashing, travel planning, tax preparation and bill paying. In its last decades, it targeted lower-income Latino clients, especially immigrants from Mexico, Guatemala, Honduras and El Salvador.
Dearden's offered its own credit, which it extended to many Latino immigrant customers for whom it was the first credit, and for many of whom it was difficult to get regular credit cards. For some undocumented immigrants in the 1990s, documents from Dearden's established that they were present in the country and helped in the process of receiving amnesty in order to become legal residents of the U.S.

In 2006 the chain had sales of $100 million.

In its last decades the Dearden's jingle proclaimed on its commercials on Spanish-language television: "Dearden's, es la tienda más grande, al servicio de usted" ("Dearden's is the largest store at your service").

At the time it closed, it had 420 employees and branch locations, including many area Latino strongholds, in Anaheim, Chino, Commerce, Huntington Park, La Puente, Santa Ana, and Van Nuys.

References

External links
Dearden's Television Commercial
Dearden's Television Commercial
Dearden's Television Commercial

Defunct department stores based in Greater Los Angeles
Furniture retailers of the United States
1909 establishments in California
Retail companies established in 1909
2017 disestablishments in California
Main Street (Los Angeles)